José Nogales (October 21, 1860 – December 7, 1908) was a Spanish journalist and writer.

Works

Novels
Ladybug Lion (1901)
The Patriot (1901)

Stories
Mosaic (1891)
In the depths of hell or zurrapas of the century (1896)
Rocío Letters (1900)
Types and customs (1901)
The three things Uncle John (1905)

External links
 

Spanish male writers
1860 births
1908 deaths